Pothos scandens is a climbing tropical forest plant in the family Araceae.  It is the type species of the genus Pothos. No subspecies are recorded in the Catalogue of Life.

The distribution of P. scandens is: Bangladesh, Brunei, Cambodia, China (Yunnan), Comoros, India (including Andaman and Nicobar Islands), Indonesia (Java, Kalimantan, Maluku, Nusa Tenggara, Sumatera), Laos, Madagascar, Malaysia (Peninsular Malaysia and Sabah), Myanmar, Philippines, Seychelles, Sri Lanka, Thailand and Vietnam. In Vietnamese it is called tràng phao dây or ráy leo.

Gallery

References

External links
 
 
 International Aroid Society: 9. Pothos scandens L.

Pothoideae
Flora of China
Flora of the Western Indian Ocean
Flora of tropical Asia
Taxa named by Carl Linnaeus